Pakila is a neighbourhood in Northern Helsinki, about nine kilometers from the city center. It comprises  Länsi-Pakila ("West Pakila") and Itä-Pakila ("East Pakila"). Pakila has approximately 10 275 inhabitants.

In Pakila the average size of the apartments is the second largest in Helsinki, 98 m2.

Since the 1970s, the largest party in Pakila has been Coalition. The National Coalition Party was the most popular party in Pakila in the 2012 municipal elections (50% support) and in the 2015 parliamentary elections (44% support).

Pakila is home to many celebrities, such as Antero Vartia, Arto Bryggare, Erkki Junkkarinen, Jimi Constantine, Kari Hotakainen, Martti Larni, Oskari Mörö, Samuli Laiho, and Signmark.

References

Venues of the 1952 Summer Olympics
Neighbourhoods of Helsinki
Olympic cycling venues